Whatever Gets You Through the Day is the third studio album released by UK duo Lighthouse Family in November 2001 on Wildcard / Polydor. The album produced the singles "(I Wish I Knew How It Would Feel to Be) Free / One", "Run" and "Happy". It reached Platinum status.

Track listing

Charts

Weekly charts

Year-end charts

Certifications

References

2001 albums
Lighthouse Family albums
albums produced by Kevin Bacon (producer)
albums produced by Jonathan Quarmby
Polydor Records albums